Soběnov is a municipality and village in Český Krumlov District in the South Bohemian Region of the Czech Republic. It has about 400 inhabitants.

Administrative parts
The village of Smrhov and the hamlet of Přísečno are administrative parts of Soběnov.

References

Villages in Český Krumlov District